K245BY (96.9 FM, "96.9 Hits FM") is a translator broadcasting the rhythmic contemporary format of the HD2 subcarrier of KLTA-FM. Licensed to Moorhead, Minnesota, it serves the Fargo-Moorhead metropolitan area.  The station is currently owned by Brooke Ingstad, the daughter of Radio FM Media owner James Ingstad.  All the offices and studios are located at 2720 7th Ave S Street in Fargo, which is where the translator's transmitter is located. The station signed on March 15, 2015. 96.9 Hits FM and Hot Adult Contemporary sister station KLTA-FM "Big 98.7" compete against heritage top 40 (CHR) station KOYY "Y94".

References

Former DJs
 Alek (now at KASE-FM)
 Mercades (Intern Daddy's Girl) (now at KLTA)
 Pike Taylor (now at WOMX-FM)
 Mikey
 Lil’ Raspy

Station Staff
 James (Mon-Fri 6a-12p)
 Amanda (Mon-Fri 12p-6p)
 Gordo (Mon-Fri 6p-12a)

External links
96.9 Hits FM

Rhythmic contemporary radio stations in the United States
LTA-HD2
Radio stations established in 2015
2015 establishments in Minnesota
Moorhead, Minnesota
Radio stations in Minnesota